The 'V' Institute is a technical education institution formed in 1941, at Kollam, in the State of Kerala, India. The institution focuses on providing job-oriented technical education, and is accredited and recognized by the Government. of India for conducting ITI Courses, and by the Government of Kerala State for conducting KGCE Courses.

Founder
The V Institute was founded in 1941 by a high school teacher-turned-educational entrepreneur Shri. V.E. Isaac, setting up the first campus at Lakshminada, Kollam.

References

External links
The 'V' Institute, Web Site

Colleges in Kerala
Universities and colleges in Kollam
1941 establishments in India
Educational institutions established in 1941